Nicholas John Grabowsky (born May 7, 1966) is a horror/fantasy author and screenwriter.

Early life 

Grabowsky was born in Norwalk, California in 1966 to parents Arthur J. Grabowsky and Doris Ruth Moreno. From 1966 to 1995, he resided with his family in Southern California, primarily in Anaheim but also for shorter periods in surrounding towns such as Garden Grove. He attended Thomas Alva Edison Elementary School in Anaheim, and later Dr. Jonas E. Salk Elementary School.

He wrote creative writing while at school, contributing to periodicals such as Jack N' Jill Magazine, and also, as a result of his strict conservative Christian Pentecostal upbringing, became involved with evangelism, related contemporary Christian music, and songwriting. By the age of 18, he was preaching, singing, and playing piano to congregations of over 1,000 people.

In 1993, Grabowsky's parents moved with their autistic daughter Carol Jean to Sacramento, California. In June 1995, Carol went missing from her adult education services school, and her body was found by in a drainage ditch near Discovery Park, Sacramento, in October 1995. The case remains as an unsolved closed case.

Writing career
After working as an extra in Hollywood for such films as Masters of the Universe and Night of the Creeps,, and pursuing a modelling career, Grabowsky became the acting coach to Walter Koenig, who introduced Nicholas to a New York publisher of mass market paperback novels. His first novel, Pray Serpent's Prey, a Christian allegory of vampires invading a small Montana town which Grabowsky began writing in high school, was accepted and published by Critic's Choice Paperbacks/Lorevan Publishing under the pseudonym Nicholas Randers. Grabowsky published subsequent works under the Randers name including The Rag Man and Tale of the Makeshift Faire before 1990, and romance novels and self-help books under the name Marsena Shane including Sweet Dreams Lady Moon, The Easy Way to Great Legs, Your Heart Belongs to You and June Park up until 1991, when he left his pseudonyms. He also wrote a commissioned sequel to Wes Craven's Shocker, which was never produced. In 1988, he wrote the novelization of Halloween IV, which was published under his real name and became a bestseller.In 2001, Grabowsky completed his novel The Everborn, which won the award for Science Fiction Novel of the Year (2004) from the American Author's Association. In 2002, he established the small press of Diverse Media, which published a limited edition of his Halloween 4 novelization, followed by Diverse Tales, The Wicked Haze, the children's book Flatty Kat: Tales of an Urban Feline with Phyllis Haupert, and Nick Reads & Reviews. In 2008, he established the small traditional publishing house of Black Bed Sheet Books, which publishes authors mainly in the horror/fantasy category, and Black Bed Sheet Productions, which produces independent feature films. In 2008, he co-wrote the screenplay for Into the Basement with Norm Applegate, based on Applegate's book, for Triad Pictures, scheduled for release in 2009.

Grabowsky's work has also been published in comic form. In 2010 Shot In the Dark Comics, an independent comic book company, acquired the rights to release a set of comics taken from his book "Red Wet Dirt". "Looks like A Rat To Me" was released in August 2010. The follow-up graphic novel The Father Keeper will be released in 2011. 

Bibliography
Novels

 (1988) Pray, Serpent's Prey (Nicholas Randers)
 (1988) Halloween IV
 (1988) Sweet Dreams, Lady Moon (Marsena Shane)
 (1989) The Rag Man (AKA 'Tattered,' Nicholas Randers)
 (1989) June Park (Marsena Shane)
 (1990) Tale of the Makeshift Faire (Nicholas Randers)
 (2002) The Everborn
 (2002) Halloween IV: The Special Limited Edition
 (2005) The Wicked Haze

Collections

 (2006) Diverse Tales
 (2008) Red Wet Dirt

Nonfiction

 (1988) The Easy Way to Great Legs (Marsena Shane)
 (1988) Nancy (Biography of the First Lady) (Marsena Shane)
 (1989) Your Heart Belongs to You (Marsena Shane)
 (2008) Nick Reads & Reviews

Anthologies and other publications

 (2005) Embark to Madness (Introduction)
 (2005) War of the Worlds (Introduction)
 (2005) The Invisible Man (Introduction)
 (2006) Buck Alice & the Actor-robot (editor, by author Walter Koenig)
 (2006) Fear: An Anthology of Horror & Suspense (Introduction)
 (2007) Shocking Tales of Murder & Insanity (Editor, by Jake Istre)
 (2007) Echoes of Terror (short story, Looks Like a Rat to Me)
 (2007) Doorways Magazine (Issue #4, short story, The Yuletide Thing)
 (2008) You're Dead Already...Living in Hell (Editor, by Jake Istre)
 (2008) From the Shadows (short story, The Freeway Reaper)

Children's

 (2006) Flatty Kat: Tales of an Urban Feline'' (with Phyllis Haupert)

Comics
 (2010)  "Looks Like A Rat To Me"  (Shot In The Dark Comics)
 (2011)  "The Father Keeper" Graphic Novel (Shot In The Dark Comics)

References

Fantastic Fiction.co.uk 
Encyclopedia of Speculative Fiction 
Open Library 
American Author's Association 
Internet Movie Data Base

External links

Black Bed Sheet Books

See also
 List of horror fiction writers

1966 births
20th-century American novelists
21st-century American novelists
American fantasy writers
American horror writers
American male novelists
Living people
People from Norwalk, California
American male short story writers
20th-century American short story writers
21st-century American short story writers
20th-century American male writers
21st-century American male writers
Novelists from California